Within computing, Jakarta Activation (JAF; formerly JavaBeans Activation Framework) is a Jakarta EE API that enables developers to:
 determine the type of an arbitrary piece of data,
 encapsulate access to it,
 discover the operations available on it and
 to instantiate the appropriate bean to perform the operation(s).

It also enables developers to dynamically register types of arbitrary data and actions associated with particular kinds of data. Additionally, it enables a program to dynamically provide or retrieve JavaBeans that implement actions associated with some kind of data. Originally an extension API, it was available as a standard API in Java SE (from Java SE 6 on) and Java EE, but was removed in Java SE 11.

DataSource Interface
 Provides access to an arbitrary collection of data
 Get name of the data, data-type name (content type), and the data itself as Input Stream or Output Stream
 Two implementation classes provided 
 URLDataSource simplifies the handling of data described by URLs 
 FileDataSource simple DataSource object that encapsulates a file provides data typing services -> delegated to a FileTypeMap object.
 Other implementations 
 javax.mail.internet.MimePartDataSource
 javax.mail.util.ByteArrayDataSource

DataContentHandler interface
 Convert the object to a byte stream and write it to the output stream 
 Convert streams in to objects 
 Used to get object/data which can be transferred 
 Uses java.awt.datatransfer.DataFlavor to indicate the data that can be accessed. DataFlavor is a data format as would appear on a clipboard, during drag and drop, or in a file system.

CommandMap class
 An abstract class provides an interface to a registry of command objects available in the system
 Developer develop their own implementation or use 
 MailcapCommandMap class that implements a CommandMap whose configuration is based on mailcap files (1524)
 Command list available from a MIME Type is stored in CommandInfo object.

CommandObject interface
 Interface to be implemented by JavaBeans components that are ActivationFramework aware
 Simple interface with one method: 
 setCommandContext(String verb, DataHandler dh)

Example: Compose an e-mail with attachment
import javax.activation.DataHandler;
import javax.activation.FileDataSource;
import javax.mail.internet.*;
import javax.mail.*;

...

// Create a message.
MimeMessage message = new MimeMessage(session);

...

// Create the Multipart to be added the parts to
Multipart multipart= new MimeMultipart();

// Create and fill the first text message part
MimeBodyPart mbp = new MimeBodyPart();
mbp.setText("Body");
multipart.addBodyPart(mbp);

// Create a file attachment and fill as second message part
mbp = new MimeBodyPart();
FileDataSource fds = new FileDataSource("C:\\attachment.zip");
mbp.setDataHandler(new DataHandler(fds));
mbp.setFileName(fds.getName());
multipart.addBodyPart(mbp);

// Add the multipart to the message
message.setContent(multipart);

...

References

External links
 
 JSR 925: JavaBeans Activation Framework 1.2 Specification
 Introduction to JavaBeans Activation Framework
 Introductory presentation
 
 Example also available in Java 6 New Features: A Tutorial book, chapter-13  

Java (programming language)